Sierakowski (feminine: Sierakowska) is a surname. It may refer to:

  (1846–1912), Polish jurist and parliamentarian
 Barbara Sierakowska (1748–1831), Polish actress and opera singer
 Brian Sierakowski (born 1945), Australian-rules footballer
 David Sierakowski (born 1974), Australian-rules footballer
 Sławomir Sierakowski (born 1979), a Polish left-wing activist, political commentator, sociologist

Localities
 Marianów Sierakowski, village near Gostynin, Poland
 Sieraków Landscape Park in west-central Poland

See also
 Dworek Sierakowskich, building in Sopot, Poland

Polish-language surnames